The Kürşım (Kürşım; , Kurchum) is a river in the East Kazakhstan Region, Kazakhstan. It is a right tributary of the Ertıs (Irtysh).

References

External links

Rivers of Kazakhstan
Tributaries of the Irtysh